The Mograbin diadem snake (Spalerosophis dolichospilus), also known commonly as Werner's diadem snake, is a species of snake in the family Colubridae. The species is endemic to northwestern Africa.

Geographic range
Spalerosophis dolichospilus is found in Algeria, Morocco, and Tunisia.

Habitat
The natural habitats of S. dolichospilus are subtropical or tropical, dry shrubland, rocky areas, arable land, and pastureland.

Etymology
The common name, Mograbin diadem snake, is derived from "Maghreb", meaning "west" in Arabic.

Description
It is orange with circular spots of reddish or greenish brown.

Behavior
Spalerosophis dolichospilus is very agile and can move quickly over rocky substrates.

Reproduction
Spalerosophis dolichospilus is oviparous.

References

Further reading
Pasteur G (1967). "Un serpent endémique du Maghreb: Spalerosophis dolichospilus (Werner), Colubridé ". Bulletin du Muséum national d'Histoire naturelle, Paris, Séries seconde 39 (3): 444–451. (Spalerosophis dolichospilus, new status). (in French).
Schmidt KP (1930). "Reptiles of Marshall Field North Arabian Desert Expeditions, 1927–1928". Field Museum of Natural History Zoological Series 17 (6): 221-230 + Plate II. (Spalerosophis diadema dolichospila, new combination, p. 226).
Werner F (1923). "Neue Schlangen des Naturhistorischen Museums in Wien ". Annalen des Naturhistorischen Museums in Wien 36: 160–166. (Zamenis diadema var. dolichospila, new variety, p. 166). (in German).
Werner F (1929). "Wissenschaftliche Ergebnisse einer zoologischen Forschungsreise nach Westalgerien und Marokko ". Sitzungsberichte der Akademie der Wissenschaft in Wien, mathematisch-naturwissenschaftliche  Klasse 138: 1-34 + Plates I-IV. (Coluber diadema dolichospila, new combination and new status, p. 7 + Plate IV, figure 7). (in German).

External links
Algerian Postage Stamp depicting Mograbin Diadem Snake

Spalerosophis
Snakes of Africa
Reptiles of North Africa
Taxa named by Franz Werner
Reptiles described in 1923
Taxonomy articles created by Polbot